Vernon C. Schokman (1905 – 1991) was a cricketer who played first-class cricket for Ceylon from 1929 to 1935.

Schokman attended Trinity College, Kandy. A wicket-keeper and useful batsman, he was Ceylon's principal wicket-keeper in the 1930s. He toured India in 1932-33, when in the six first-class matches he made 256 runs at an average of 25.60 and made his highest score of 62 against Sind, which was also Ceylon's top score for the match.

He also represented Ceylon at rugby against the visiting Māori team in 1926.

He worked for the police force.

References

External links

1905 births
1991 deaths
Alumni of Trinity College, Kandy
Sri Lankan cricketers
All-Ceylon cricketers
Sri Lankan rugby union players